Cepora laeta, the Timor gull, is a butterfly in the family Pieridae. It is found on Timor.

References

Pierini
Butterflies described in 1862